Italy has participated in all editions of the European Mountain Running Championships, since the first edition of 1994 European Mountain Running Championships.

Men

Individual

Medal table individual

Medal table team

Women

Individual

Medal table individual

Medal table team

References

External links
 European Athletic Association
 FIDAL - Federazione Italyna Di Atletica Leggera

Athletics in Italy